Henry Warren Austin (January 22, 1864 – June 25, 1947) was an American politician and businessman.

Biography
Austin was born in Oak Park, Illinois. He went to the Oak Park and Chicago public schools. Austin also went to Williams College. He served as the president of the Oak Park Trust and Savings Bank. Austin also served as president of the Cicero, Illinois School Board and as treasurer of the village of Oak Park. Austin served in the Illinois House of Representatives from 1903 to 1909 and in the Illinois Senate from 1915 to 1923. He was a Republican. His father Henry W. Austin Sr. also served in the Illinois General Assembly. Austin died at his home in Oak Park, Illinois from heart problems.

Notes

External links

1864 births
1947 deaths
People from Oak Park, Illinois
Williams College alumni
Businesspeople from Illinois
School board members in Illinois
Republican Party members of the Illinois House of Representatives
Republican Party Illinois state senators